"Got 2 Be Down" is the fourth and final single from Robin Thicke's second studio album The Evolution of Robin Thicke. It was officially released to radio stations on  October 2, 2007. Originally "Got 2 Be Down" was expected to be the 3rd single but due to Faith Evans' pregnancy plans the release for the single were put on hold. In late 2007 "Got 2 Be Down" was getting very little airplay.

Chart performance

References

Robin Thicke songs
2007 singles
Songs written by Robin Thicke
2005 songs
Interscope Records singles
Songs written by Faith Evans